The 1994–95 LEN European Cup was the 32nd edition of LEN's premier competition for men's water polo clubs.

Quarter-finals

|}

Semi-finals

|}

Finals

See also
1994–95 LEN Cup Winners' Cup
1994–95 LEN Cup

References

 

LEN Champions League seasons
1994 in water polo
1995 in water polo